During the 2013–14 season Jong Ajax will participate in the Dutch Eerste Divisie, the 2nd tier of professional football in the Netherlands.

The 2013–14 AFC Ajax season marks the Jupiler League debut of the AFC Ajax reserves' squad Jong Ajax. Previously playing in the Beloften Eredivisie (a separate league for reserve teams, not included in the Dutch professional or amateur league structure) players were allowed to move around freely between the reserve team and the first team during the course of the season. This will no longer be the case as Jong Ajax will register and field a separate squad from that of Ajax first team whose home matches will be played at Sportpark De Toekomst while playing in the Eerste Divisie, except for the occasional match in the Amsterdam Arena. The only period in which players will be able to move between squads will be during the transfer windows. Furthermore, the team is not eligible for promotion to the Eredivisie. Jong Ajax are joined in the Eerste Divisie by Jong Twente and Jong PSV, reserve teams who have also moved from the Beloften Eredivisie to the Eerste Divisie.

Pre-season
The first training for the 2013–14 season was held on 24 June 2013. In preparation for the new season Ajax organized a training stage at Sportpark De Toekomst, Amsterdam, Netherlands. The squad from manager Alfons Groenendijk stayed there from 15 July 2013 to 29 July 2013. During this training stage friendly matches were played against Voorschoten '97, Rijnsburgse Boys, Almere City FC and VV Noordwijk.

Player statistics 
Appearances for competitive matches only

|-
|colspan="14"|First team players who have made appearances for reserve squad:

|-
|colspan="14"|Youth players who have made appearances for reserve squad:

|-
|colspan="14"|Players sold or loaned out after the start of the season:

|-
|}
Updated 1 March 2014

Eerste Divisie standings 2013–14

Points by match day

Total points by match day

Standing by match day

Goals by match day

2012–13 Team records

Topscorers

Competitions
All times are in CEST

Eerste Divisie

Friendlies

References

Jong Ajax seasons